Baxley is a surname. Notable people with the surname include:

Barbara Baxley (1923–1990), American actress and singer
Bill Baxley (born 1941), politician
Henry Willis Baxley (1803–1876), American physician
Isaac Rieman Baxley (1850–1920), American poet and playwright and son of Henry Willis
Jack Baxley (1884–1950), American character actor 
Lucy Baxley (1937–2016), politician
Rob Baxley (born 1969), American football player